The Revenge of Maciste (Italian: La rivincita di Maciste) is a 1921 Italian silent adventure film directed by Luigi Romano Borgnetto and starring Bartolomeo Pagano, Henriette Bonard and Erminia Zago. It is part of the series of Maciste films.

Cast
 Bartolomeo Pagano as Maciste
 Henriette Bonard  as Miss Elisa Guappana
 Erminia Zago  as Miss Dorothy Bull-Dog
 Guido Clifford 
 Mario Voller-Buzzi 
 Gino-Lelio Comelli 
 Giulio Dogliotti 
 Emilio Vardannes 
 Leone Heller
 Felice Minotti

References

Bibliography
 Roy Kinnard & Tony Crnkovich. Italian Sword and Sandal Films, 1908–1990. McFarland, 2017.

External links
 

1921 films
1920s Italian-language films
Films directed by Luigi Romano Borgnetto
Italian silent feature films
Italian black-and-white films
1921 adventure films
Italian adventure films
Silent adventure films
1920s Italian films